The Portaikos Bridge is an Ottoman-era stone bridge over the Portaikos River in the Trikala Prefecture, Thessaly, Greece.

The bridge is located on the 22nd kilometer of the Trikala–Arta national road, near the village of Pyli. It was built in 1514 by the Metropolitan of Larissa, Saint Bessarion, and until 1936 it was the only way connecting the Thessalian plain with the settlements of the Pindus mountain chain, through the nearby Porta pass. It remains the second largest pre-20th century bridge in Thessaly to this day.

The bridge consists of a single semi-circular arch with a span of 29 m and features a deck 2.1 m-wide. The bridge is built of rubble masonry except for the ledge, which is built of hewn sandstone. The bridge retains its original form except for maintenance work over the years, which has included the reconstruction of the parapet.

References

Buildings and structures in Trikala (regional unit)
Buildings and structures completed in 1514
Stone bridges in Greece
Ottoman architecture in Thessaly
Bridges completed in the 16th century
Ottoman bridges in Greece
16th-century architecture in Greece